1930 in sports describes the year's events in world sport.

American football
 NFL championship – Green Bay Packers (10–3–1)
 College football national championship – Notre Dame Fighting Irish

Association football
FIFA World Cup
 The inaugural World Cup is held in Uruguay and is won by the host nation as Uruguay defeats Argentina 4–2 in the final.
England
 The Football League – Sheffield Wednesday 60 points, Derby County 50, Manchester City 47, Aston Villa 47, Leeds United 46, Blackburn Rovers 45
 FA Cup final – Arsenal 2–0 Huddersfield Town at Empire Stadium, Wembley, London
Germany
 National Championship – Hertha BSC 5–4 Holstein Kiel at Düsseldorf
Spain
 La Liga won by Athletic Bilbao
Italy
 The inaugural Serie A is won by Ambrosiana

Athletics
Czechoslovakia
 the third Women's World Games, Prague

Australian rules football
VFL Premiership
 Collingwood wins the 34th VFL Premiership, beating Geelong 14.16 (100) to 9.16 (70) at Melbourne Cricket Ground (MCG)
Brownlow Medal
 The annual Brownlow Medal is awarded to Stan Judkins (Richmond), Allan Hopkins (Footscray) and Harry Collier (Collingwood)
South Australian National Football League
 4 October: North Adelaide 9.13 (67) defeats Port Adelaide 9.9 (63) for its fifth SA(N)FL premiership
 Magarey Medal won by Walter Scott (Norwood)
West Australian Football League
 4 October: East Fremantle 12.15 (87) defeats South Fremantle 7.9 (51) to win its third consecutive premiership.
 Sandover Medal won by Ted Flemming (West Perth)

Bandy
Sweden

 Championship final – SK Tirfing 1-0 Djurgårdens IF

Baseball
World Series
 1–8 October — Philadelphia Athletics defeats St Louis Cardinals to win the 1930 World Series by 4 games to 2

Basketball
ABL Championship

Cleveland Rosenblums win four games to one over the Rochester Centrals

Events
 The South American Basketball Championship 1930 is the first major international basketball competition when four South American teams play in Montevideo and the host nation Uruguay wins the tournament.

Europe
 Olimpia Milan, most successful professional basketball club in Italy, officially founded.
 Club Joventut Badalona was founded in Spain

Bobsleigh
World Bobsleigh Championships
 Inaugural world championship is held at Caux-sur-Montreux in Switzerland.  It features a four-man bob event only, which is won by Italy.

Boxing
Events
 Max Schmeling defeats Jack Sharkey by a controversial fourth round foul punch decision to take the vacant World Heavyweight Championship title
Lineal world champions
 World Heavyweight Championship – vacant → Max Schmeling
 World Light Heavyweight Championship – vacant → Maxie Rosenbloom
 World Middleweight Championship – Mickey Walker
 World Welterweight Championship – Jackie Fields → "Young" Jack Thompson → Tommy Freeman
 World Lightweight Championship – Sammy Mandell → Al Singer → Tony Canzoneri
 World Featherweight Championship – Bat Battalino
 World Bantamweight Championship – "Panama" Al Brown
 World Flyweight Championship – vacant

Canadian football
Grey Cup
 18th Grey Cup – Toronto Balmy Beach 11–6 Regina Roughriders

Cricket
Events
 January — New Zealand plays its inaugural Test match, losing to England at Christchurch by eight wickets. England goes on to win the series 1–0 with three matches drawn.
 Having scored 1586 runs in the 1929–30 Australian season at an average of 113.28 and including a world record individual innings of 452*, Don Bradman continues in the same vein through the Australian tour of England in 1930. Australia regains The Ashes, winning the Test series by 2–1 with two matches drawn. Bradman, with 974 runs in the series (still a world record), is the main difference between two strong teams.  The highlight of the tour is Bradman's remarkable innings at Headingley in the Third Test when he makes 309 not out in a single day (his final score is 334).
England
 County Championship – Lancashire
 Minor Counties Championship – Durham
 Most runs – Don Bradman 2960 @ 98.66 (HS 334)
 Most wickets – Tich Freeman 275 @ 16.84 (BB 10–53)
 Wisden Cricketers of the Year – Donald Bradman, Clarrie Grimmett, Beverley Lyon, Ian Peebles, Maurice Turnbull
Australia
 Sheffield Shield – Victoria
 Most runs – Don Bradman 1586 @ 113.28 (HS 452*)
 Most wickets – Clarrie Grimmett 82 @ 23.69 (BB 7–136)
India
 Bombay Quadrangular – Hindus
New Zealand
 Plunket Shield – Wellington
South Africa
 Currie Cup – not contested
West Indies
 Inter-Colonial Tournament – not contested

Cycling
Tour de France
 André Leducq (France) wins the 24th Tour de France

Figure skating
World Figure Skating Championships
 World Men's Champion – Karl Schäfer (Austria)
 World Women's Champion – Sonja Henie (Norway)
 World Pairs Champions – Andreé Joly-Brunet and Pierre Brunet (France)

Golf
Events
 Bobby Jones becomes the first man to win the golfing Grand Slam
Major tournaments
 British Open – Bobby Jones
 U.S. Open – Bobby Jones
 PGA Championship – Tommy Armour
Other tournaments
 British Amateur – Bobby Jones
 U.S. Amateur – Bobby Jones
Women's professional
 Women's Western Open – Lucia Mida

Handball
25 November – The Swedish Handball Federation is established.

Horse racing
England
 Champion Hurdle – Brown Tony
 Cheltenham Gold Cup – Easter Hero
 Grand National – Shaun Goilin
 1,000 Guineas Stakes – Fair Isle
 2,000 Guineas Stakes – Diolite
 The Derby – Blenheim
 The Oaks – Rose of England
 St. Leger Stakes – Singapore
Australia
 Melbourne Cup – Phar Lap
Canada
 King's Plate – Aymond
France
 Prix de l'Arc de Triomphe – Motrico
Ireland
 Irish Grand National – Fanmond
 Irish Derby Stakes – Rock Star
USA
 Kentucky Derby – Gallant Fox
 Preakness Stakes – Gallant Fox
 Belmont Stakes – Gallant Fox

Ice hockey
Stanley Cup
 28–29 March — Montreal Canadiens defeats Boston Bruins by 2 games to 0 in the 1930 Stanley Cup Finals

Motorsport

Multi-sport events
British Empire Games
 Inaugural British Empire Games, precursor of the Commonwealth Games are held at Hamilton, Ontario
Far Eastern Championship Games
 9th Far Eastern Championship Games are held at Tokyo, Empire of Japan

Nordic skiing
FIS Nordic World Ski Championships
 5th FIS Nordic World Ski Championships 1930 are held at Oslo-Holmenkollen ski jump, Norway

Rowing
The Boat Race
 12 April — Cambridge wins the 82nd Oxford and Cambridge Boat Race

Rugby league
The Australia national rugby league team completed on the 1929–30 Kangaroo tour of Great Britain.
England
 Championship – Huddersfield
 Challenge Cup final – Widnes 10–3 St. Helens at Empire Stadium, Wembley, London 
 Lancashire League Championship – St. Helens
 Yorkshire League Championship – Huddersfield
 Lancashire County Cup – Warrington 15–2 Salford
 Yorkshire County Cup – Hull Kingston Rovers 13–7 Hunslet
Australia
 NSW Premiership – Western Suburbs 27–2 St George (grand final)

Rugby union
Five Nations Championship
 43rd Five Nations Championship series is won by England

Snooker
World Championship
 4th World Snooker Championship is won by Joe Davis who defeats Tom Dennis 25–12

Speed skating
Speed Skating World Championships
 Men's All-round Champion – Michael Staksrud (Norway)

Tennis

Australia
 Australian Men's Singles Championship – Edgar Moon (Australia) defeats Harry Hopman (Australia) 6–3 6–1 6–3
 Australian Women's Singles Championship – Daphne Akhurst Cozens (Australia) defeats Sylvia Lance Harper (Australia) 10–8 2–6 7–5 
England
 Wimbledon Men's Singles Championship – Bill Tilden (USA) defeats Wilmer Allison (USA) 6–3 9–7 6–4
 Wimbledon Women's Singles Championship – Helen Wills Moody (USA) defeats Elizabeth Ryan (USA) 6–2 6–2
France
 French Men's Singles Championship – Henri Cochet (France) defeats Bill Tilden (USA) 3–6 8–6 6–3 6–1 
 French Women's Singles Championship – Helen Wills Moody (USA) defeats Helen Jacobs (USA) 6–2 6–1
USA
 American Men's Singles Championship – John Doeg (USA) defeats Frank Shields (USA) 10–8 1–6 6–4 16–14
 American Women's Singles Championship – Betty Nuthall Shoemaker (Great Britain) defeats Anna McCune Harper (USA) 6–1 6–4
Davis Cup
 1930 International Lawn Tennis Challenge –  4–1  at Stade Roland Garros (clay) Paris, France

Yacht racing
America's Cup
 The New York Yacht Club retains the America's Cup as Enterprise defeats British challenger Shamrock V, of the Royal Ulster Yacht Club by 4 races to 0

Notes
Awarded retrospectively by the VFL in 1989.

References

 
Sports by year